Jin Yangyang (born 3 February 1993 in Dalian) is a Chinese professional footballer who currently plays for Chinese Super League club Tianjin Jinmen Tiger on loan from Shanghai Shenhua.

Club career
Jin started his professional football career in 2011 when he was promoted to Chinese Super League side Dalian Shide.  On 9 July 2012, he made his senior debut for Dalian Shide in a 1–0 away victory against Changchun Yatai, coming on as a substitute for Zhang Yaokun in the 80th minute.  He made 2 league appearances in the 2012 league season.
In 2013, Jin transferred to Dalian Aerbin after Dalian Shide dissolved. On 13 August 2014, he made his debut for Dalian Aerbin in the 2014 Chinese Super League against Guangzhou Evergrande.

In January 2015, Jin transferred to fellow Chinese Super League side Guangzhou R&F. He made his debut for Guangzhou on 24 February 2015 in a 2015 AFC Champions League against Gamba Osaka with a 2–0 away win, coming on as a substitute for Míchel in the 88th minute. On 3 April 2015, he scored his first and second senior goal in a 4–0 home win against Guizhou Renhe. However, he received a ban of four matches for waving the finger during the match.

Jin moved to Super League newcomer Hebei China Fortune on 19 February 2016 with a transfer fee of ¥80 million. On 4 March 2016, he made his debut for Hebei in a 2–1 away win against Guangzhou R&F.

On 12 April 2021, Jin joined Shanghai Shenhua on a free transfer. On 13 July 2021, Jin was loaned to Tianjin Jinmen Tiger before making an appearance for Shenhua. He made his debut for Jinmen Tiger on 19 July 2021 in a goalless draw against Beijing Guoan, which was also his 100th career game in all competitions.

International career
Jin was called up to the senior Chinese training camp for the 2018 FIFA World Cup qualification – AFC Third Round in July 2016.

Career statistics
Statistics accurate as of match played 28 July 2021.

References

External links
 

1993 births
Living people
Chinese footballers
Footballers from Dalian
Dalian Shide F.C. players
Dalian Professional F.C. players
Guangzhou City F.C. players
Hebei F.C. players
Chinese Super League players
Association football defenders